Milan Špinka (born 5 May 1951) is a former international speedway rider from Czechoslovakia.

Speedway career 
Špinka won the gold medal at the Individual Ice Speedway World Championship in the 1974 Individual Ice Speedway World Championship. He also won a silver and bronze medal at the Championships.

He rode in the top tier of British Speedway from 1979 to 1983, riding for Ipswich Witches and Swindon Robins.

World final appearances

Individual Ice Speedway World Championship
1971  Inzell, 3rd - 21pts
1973  Inzell, 6th - 21pts
1974  Nässjö, champion - 15 pts
1975  Moscow, 12th - 8pts 
1976  Assen, 2nd 27pts 
1978  Assen, 17th - 2pts
1980  Kalinin, 11th - 10pts
1981  Assen, 14th - 6pts

World Longtrack Championship
 1973 -  Oslo (10th) 7pts

References 

1951 births
Czech speedway riders
Swindon Robins riders
Ipswich Witches riders
Sportspeople from Pardubice
Living people